Anne Moen Bullitt (February 24, 1924 – August 18, 2007) was an American socialite, philanthropist, and horsebreeder.  In her youth she was regarded as a great beauty, and was known for assembling a wardrobe of rare and valuable classic haute couture items.  She traveled widely and was married four times.

She bought a 700-acre estate in County Kildare, Ireland, where she became one of Ireland's first female horsebreeders.

Early life

Bullitt's mother was Louise Bryant, best known for writing, as a witness to the founding of the Soviet Union, where she had traveled with her second husband John Silas Reed. Her father was an independently wealthy diplomat William C. Bullitt Jr., who had been in Russia at the time of the founding of the Soviet Union, as an unofficial observer for President Woodrow Wilson. The pair married in 1924, four years after Reed died of typhus in the Soviet Union, weeks before Anne Moen's birth.

Bullitt had almost no contact with her mother, as her father had divorced her when Anne was an infant, claiming she was an alcoholic and unfit mother. Accounts said young Anne followed her father everywhere, including on his diplomatic missions, and that he allowed her to hide, and listen, when he had meetings with other VIPs.

Legacy

Fashion legacy

According to Decades magazine she was a great beauty.  
Decades magazine wrote she had an 18-inch waist, paired with a generous bosom. When her estate auctioned her extensive wardrobe of high-fashion items, at Christie's in 2009, the Irish Independent reported she had a 20-inch waist and an hourglass figure.

Parents' papers
Bullitt, and her advisors, donated the papers of her famous parents to Yale University, her father's alma mater, and she helped clarify some aspects of their lives. Her father was an early friend and supporter of pioneering psychotherapist Sigmund Freud, and he published a controversial book analyzing Woodrow Wilson, titled Thomas Woodrow Wilson – A Psychological Study.
According to the New York Daily News, after Freud heard Bullitt declare she was so devoted to her father, she looked upon him as her god, he replied: "You know, I have developed a theory that male children's first love is their mother, and females', the father. But this is the first time a child has confirmed my theory."

Palmerston House and Stud
Bullitt's health failed in her old age. Her vision deteriorated to the point that she lived in just three rooms of her stately Irish home. In 2000, after she agreed to sell her estate to Jim Mansfield, surprising her financial advisors, who had recommended a different buyer. In 2000, they had her declared a ward of court.

In 2009, Bullitt's estate sued firms owned by Mansfield. Representatives claimed that a deposit he promised for the property that was supposed to be held in trust, and paid when the sale was completed, had been deposited with a company he owned, and never was paid. Her estate claimed that personal possession of Bullitt were improperly in the possession of Mansfield, including valuable works of art by Pablo Picasso and pistols once owned by George Washington.

References

1924 births
2007 deaths
American socialites
American women philanthropists
Philanthropists from Pennsylvania
People from Philadelphia
American expatriates in the Republic of Ireland
Anne
20th-century American philanthropists
20th-century women philanthropists